Liolaemus lorenzmuelleri, commonly known as Lorenz's tree iguana, is a species of lizard in the family Iguanidae. The species is endemic to Chile.

Etymology
The specific name, lorenzmuelleri, is in honor of German herpetologist Lorenz Müller.

Geographic range
L. lorenzmuelleri is found in Coquimbo Region, Chile.

Reproduction
L. lorenzmuelleri is oviparous.

References

Further reading
Hellmich W (1950). "Die Eidechsen der Ausbeute Schröder (Gattung Liolaemus, Iguan.) (Beiträge zur Kenntnis der Herpetofauna Chiles. XIII.) ". Veröffentlichungen der Zoologischen Staatssammlung München 1: 129–194. (Liolaemus lorenzmülleri, new species, pp. 144–146 + Plate 12, Figures 26–27). (in German).

lorenzmuelleri
Lizards of South America
Endemic fauna of Chile
Reptiles of Chile
Reptiles described in 1950
Taxonomy articles created by Polbot